Gail L. Heriot is an American attorney and legal scholar serving as a Professor of Law at the University of San Diego School of Law. Since 2007, she has been a member of the United States Commission on Civil Rights.

Education
Heriot earned a Bachelor of Arts from Northwestern University in 1978 and Juris Doctor from University of Chicago in 1981, where she was an editor of the University of Chicago Law Review. She is a member of Phi Beta Kappa and Order of the Coif.

Career
Prior to becoming an academic, Heriot clerked for Seymour Simon on the Supreme Court of Illinois and practiced at law firms in Chicago and Washington, D.C. Heriot joined the faculty of the University of San Diego School of Law in 1989 where she teaches, inter alia, Civil Rights Law and History, Employment Discrimination, Products Liability, Remedies, and Torts. Heriot was a professor and associate dean at George Mason University School of Law from 1998 to 1999 while on leave from the University of San Diego.

Heriot's areas of expertise include civil rights, employment law, and product liability. She is a former civil rights counsel to the United States Senate Committee on the Judiciary.

Heriot is the author of numerous academic and professional papers. She writes a column for National Review. Additionally, she has testified extensively before governmental bodies and has authored many opinion pieces in newspapers and magazines.

References

External links 
 SSRN Author Page for Gail Heriot
 

Living people
Northwestern University alumni
University of Chicago Law School alumni
United States Commission on Civil Rights members
Year of birth missing (living people)